This article is the Electoral history of Jean Chrétien, the twentieth Prime Minister of Canada.

A liberal, Chrétien served three terms as Prime Minister (1993 to 2003), having decisively defeated Prime Minister Kim Campbell in the 1993 general election.  He was the first prime minister to win three consecutive majority governments since Sir Wilfrid Laurier.

Chrétien led the Liberal Party of Canada in three general elections (1993, 1997 and 2000). He resigned the party leadership in 2003 and was succeeded by Paul Martin.

Chrétien stood for election to the House of Commons of Canada twelve times and was elected each time (eleven general elections and one by-election).  He served continuously in the House from 1963 to 1986, when he resigned over disagreements with Liberal leader John Turner. After winning the Liberal leadership in 1990, he re-entered the Commons by a by-election, and was re-elected three more times, until he retired in 2004.

Chrétien stood for election as leader of the Liberal Party twice.  He lost in 1984 to Turner, but he won in 1990, succeeding Turner as Liberal leader.

Summary 

Chrétien ranks fifth out of twenty-three prime ministers for time in office, serving one term of ten years and thirty-eight days.

Chrétien was the sixth of eight prime ministers from Quebec, the others being Sir John Abbott, Sir Wilfrid Laurier, Louis St. Laurent, Pierre Trudeau, Brian Mulroney, Paul Martin and Justin Trudeau.  He was also the fourth of five francophone prime ministers, the others being Laurier, St. Laurent, Pierre Trudeau, and Justin Trudeau.

A lawyer, Chrétien got involved in politics at an early age. He was first elected to the House of Commons at age 30, in the federal election of 1963.  He was appointed to Cabinet by Prime Minister Lester Pearson in 1967 and remained in Cabinet until 1984 under Prime Ministers Pierre Trudeau and John Turner (except for the short Clark government (1979–80)).

Chrétien led the Liberals in three general elections, winning each time.  He is the first prime minister since Sir Wilfrid Laurier to win three back-to-back majority governments.

Chrétien stood for election to the House of Commons twelve times, all but once for the riding of Saint-Maurice, which included his home town of Shawinigan.  He won more than a majority of the votes in all but two elections, and often had strong majorities.  Chrétien was a Member of Parliament from 1963 to 1986, when he resigned over disagreements with Liberal leader John Turner.  In 1990, after winning the Liberal leadership, he was elected to the Commons in a by-election for the riding of Beauséjour in New Brunswick.  He was re-elected in Saint-Maurice in the next three elections, until he retired in 2004.  His total service in Parliament was 35 years, 10 months, and 25 days.

Chrétien stood for election as leader of the Liberal Party twice, in 1984 and 1990.  In 1984, he came in second, behind Turner.  In 1990, after Turner's resignation, he won the leadership against his principal opponent, Paul Martin.  Although Chrétien was successful in leading the party in three general elections, Martin and his supporters gradually undercut Chrétien's leadership, leading to Chrétien's retirement late in 2003.  He was succeeded by Martin as prime minister and Liberal leader.

Chrétien remained a Member of Parliament until the 2004 general election, when he retired from politics.

Federal general elections: 1993, 1997, and 2000 

Chrétien led the Liberal Party in three general elections: 1993, 1997 and 2000.  He won majority governments each time.

Federal election, 1993 

In his first general election as leader, Chrétien won a majority government and in the process reduced the Progressive Conservatives from a majority to just two seats in the Commons.

1 Leader of the Opposition when election was called;  Prime Minister after election.
2 Leader of a third party when election was called;  Leader of the Opposition after the election.
3 Prime Minister when election was called;  not a Member of Parliament after the election. 
4 Table does not include parties which received votes but did not elect any members.

Federal election, 1997 

In his second general election, Chrétien again won a majority government, albeit with a reduced number of seats, against a fractured set of opposition parties.

1 Prime Minister when election was called;  Prime Minister after election.
2 Leader of a third party when election was called;  Leader of the Opposition after the election.
3 Leader of the Opposition when election was called;  leader of a third party after the election. 
4 Table does not include parties which received votes but did not elect any members.

Federal election, 2000 

In his third general election, Chrétien won another majority government with an increased number of seats, against a number of opposition parties.

1 Prime Minister when election was called;  Prime Minister after election.
2 Leader of the Opposition when election was called;  Leader of the Opposition after the election.
3 Table does not include parties which received votes but did not elect any members.

Federal constituency elections: 1963 to 1984; 1990 to 2000 

Chrétien  stood for election to the House of Commons twelve times. He was elected each time, often with substantial majorities.

1963 Federal Election: Saint-Maurice—Laflèche 

 Elected. 
X Incumbent.
1 Rounding error.

1965 Federal Election: Saint-Maurice—Laflèche 

 Elected. 
X Incumbent.

The riding of Saint-Maurice—Laflèche was abolished in the re-distribution of 1966.

1968 Federal Election: Saint-Maurice 

 Elected. 
X Incumbent.

1972 Federal Election: Saint-Maurice 

 Elected. 
X Incumbent. 
1 Rounding error.

1974 Federal Election: Saint-Maurice 

 Elected. 
X Incumbent.

1979 Federal Election: Saint-Maurice 

 Elected. 
X Incumbent.

1980 Federal Election: Saint-Maurice 

 Elected. 
X Incumbent. 
1 Rounding error.

1984 Federal Election: Saint-Maurice 

 Elected. 
X Incumbent.

Note:  Chrétien resigned his seat effective February 27, 1986.

1990 Federal By-Election: Beauséjour 

The incumbent, Fernand Robichaud, resigned his seat on September 24, 1990, after Chrétien was elected party leader, to allow Chrétien an opportunity to enter the House of Commons.

 Elected.

1993 Federal Election: Saint-Maurice 

 Elected.

1997 Federal Election: Saint-Maurice 

 Elected. 
X Incumbent.

2000 Federal Election: Saint-Maurice 

 Elected. 
X Incumbent.

Liberal Party Leadership Conventions:  1984, 1990 

Chrétien contested the Liberal leadership twice.  He lost in 1984 to Turner, who then led the Liberal party in the next two general elections.  Turner retired after the loss in the 1988 general election, and Chrétien won the leadership convention held in 1990.

1984 Leadership Convention 

Trudeau announced his retirement early in 1984.  Chrétien entered the leadership election but lost on the second ballot to Turner.

1990 Leadership Convention 

Following the Liberal defeat in the 1988 general election, Turner announced his retirement.  At the leadership convention held in 1990, Chrétien won on the first ballot, defeating his principal opponent, Paul Martin.

1 Rounding error.

See also 

 Electoral history of Kim Campbell - Chrétien's predecessor as Prime Minister.
 Electoral history of John Turner - Chrétien's predecessor as leader of the Liberal Party.
 Electoral history of Paul Martin - Chrétien's successor as leader of the Liberal Party and as Prime Minister.

References

External links 

Library of Parliament:  History of Federal Ridings since 1867
 CPAC – 1984 Liberal Convention
 CPAC – 1990 Liberal Leadership Convention

Chrétien, Jean